North Eugene High School is a public high school in the River Road/Santa Clara neighborhoods of Eugene, Oregon, United States.

History
North Eugene High School was open to students on October 21, 1957. The opening was delayed nearly two months, causing two months of double-shifting at Colin Kelly Junior High School until the school was finally completed.

The current NEHS campus was a filbert orchard belonging to a couple of Scottish ancestry. The couple donated land to Eugene School District 4J for the high school to be built on.

The NEHS mascot, "Scottie", the Scotch Terrier, reflects the school's heritage, as do the names of the school newspaper (Caledonian) and yearbook (Tartan).

In April 2004 NEHS staff, parents, and community members were approached with information about the Oregon Small Schools Initiative project and grant opportunities. In May 2004, a $900,000 grant from the Bill & Melinda Gates Foundation was awarded to NEHS to begin this project. After a series of meetings and workshops, the school transformation officially began.

In the 2006 academic year, 3 small schools were implemented: North International High School, Academy of Arts, and School of IDEAS: Invention, Design, Engineering, Arts, & Science.

As the 2013 academic year commenced, the comprehensive high school model was reintroduced to North Eugene High School.

Academics
In 2008, 84% of the school's seniors received their high school diploma, Of 246 students, 207 graduated, 23 dropped out, 4 received a modified diploma, and 12 remained in high school.

The student-produced school newspaper, The Caledonian, appears to be the first in the area to move to an online news production model.

The students at N.E.H.S. performed at 47%, 68% and 50% proficient in Math, Reading & Science respectively on the Oregon Assessment of Knowledge and Skills.  This compares to state averages of 49%, 67% and 56%.

The school in 2016 received a bronze medal ranking from the U.S. News & World Report "America's Best High Schools" survey.

Campus Principal: Trinity Welch-Radabaugh, Scott Mayers, and Travis Sheaffer

College preparation courses
North Eugene High School is an authorized International Baccalaureate World School. All N.E.H.S. students take IB classes in Literature and History in 11th and 12th grade. Students may also choose to enroll in several other International Baccalaureate (IB) and Advanced Placement (AP) courses. The school offers a number of these courses, allowing its students the opportunity to take the cumulative exams in the spring to gain college credit at the high school level. North Eugene usually sees very high passing percentages from its students who take these exams, except on the science exams. Students are also offered CollegeNow courses, which directly give students Lane Community College credits which are often transferable to statewide universities.

Advanced Placement Courses:
Calculus AB

International Baccalaurate Courses: English A1: Language & Literature HL, History of the Americas HL, Biology HL/SL, Chemistry HL/SL, Math Studies SL, Film Studies SL, Music Theory SL, Theatre SL, Spanish B SL, Japanese B SL, Theory of Knowledge

CollegeNow Courses: Design Fundamentals, Digital Media Design, Yearbook I, II, III, Woods Processing & Woodwork I, II, III, Child Development I, II, III, Culinary Arts I, II, Human Anatomy & Physiology, Health Occupations, Pre-Calculus (Math 111/112), Calculus AB, Physics, Chemistry 150, AP/IB Chemistry, Spanish III, IV, V, Japanese III, IV, V,

Sports
The Highlanders have won the following state team championships:
 Boys' basketball – 1963, 1966, 1976, 1977, 2007
 Girls' basketball, 1989
 Girls' gymnastics, 1976
 Softball, 1998,2000
 Boys' track and field, 1962
 Girls' soccer 
 Boys' baseball, 2010
 Boys' golf, 1960

Notable alumni 
Danny Ainge — general manager and president of NBA's Boston Celtics, player for Celtics and Portland Trail Blazers, 2-time NBA champion; Major League Baseball player for Toronto Blue Jays
Brian Conklin — professional basketball player, Limoges CSP
Cassie Franklin — Mayor of Everett, Washington
Andrew Moore — MLB player, Seattle Mariners
Kenny Moore — (Class of 1962), University of Oregon (1963–66), runner, Olympic marathoner, sportswriter (Sports Illustrated), screenwriter (Without Limits), author (Bowerman and the Men of Oregon), actor in films Personal Best and Tequila Sunrise
Bob Newland — NFL wide receiver, New Orleans Saints
Robin Pflugrad — college football coach
Jerome Souers — football head coach, Northern Arizona University
Christopher Stevens — four-time Grammy Award-winning producer, mix-engineer, songwriter
David Ogden Stiers — (Class of 1960), actor in films and on television series M*A*S*H
Kailee Wong — NFL linebacker, Minnesota Vikings, Houston Texans
Kim Johnson — author of This is my America

References

External links
 North Eugene High School official website
 Eugene School District 4J official website

High schools in Lane County, Oregon
Education in Eugene, Oregon
Educational institutions established in 1957
Public high schools in Oregon
1957 establishments in Oregon